Hylarana glandulosa, commonly known as the rough-sided frog or the glandular frog, is a species of true frog in the genus Hylarana. It is native to Brunei Darussalam, Indonesia, Malaysia, Singapore, Thailand, and Vietnam. Its natural habitats are subtropical or tropical moist lowland forest, subtropical or tropical swampland, rivers, freshwater marshes, caves, and plantations. It is not considered threatened by the IUCN.

In Thailand, it is called h̄mā n̂ảm (literally: water dog) because its call sounds like a barking puppy.

References

External links
 Sound recordings of Hylarana glandulosa at BioAcoustica

Gallery of Pulchrana glandulosa

glandulosa
Fauna of Brunei
Amphibians of Indonesia
Amphibians of Malaysia
Amphibians of Singapore
Amphibians of Thailand
Amphibians of Vietnam
Amphibians of Borneo
Fauna of Sumatra
Amphibians described in 1882
Taxobox binomials not recognized by IUCN